Pothureddy Palli is a village in Nuzvid mandal, located in Krishna of Andhra Pradesh, India.

References

Villages in Krishna district